Demirtaş is a village in the Gerger District, Adıyaman Province, Turkey. The village is populated by Kurds of the Kirvar tribe and had a population of 132 i 2021.

The hamlets of Alaca and Güzelce are attached to the village.

References

Villages in Gerger District
Kurdish settlements in Adıyaman Province